Porth Harlequins Rugby Football Club is a Welsh rugby union team based in Porth in the Rhondda Valley. Porth RFC is a member of the Welsh Rugby Union and is a feeder club for the Cardiff Blues.

Club honours
 2007/08 WRU Division Five South East - Champions
 2011/12 WRU Division Four South East - Champions
 2014/15 Worthington Mid-District Bowl Final - Winners
 2015/16 WRU Division Two East Central  - Champions

References

Welsh rugby union teams